Howard Lee Miller (July 6, 1888 - October 7, 1977) was a Democratic member of the Mississippi House of Representatives from Clarke County, serving from 1916 to 1924.

Biography 
Howard Lee Miller was born on July 6, 1888, in Increase, Mississippi. He was the son of Eli Carmichael Miller and Martha Ann (Dearman) Miller. He graduated from Millsaps College with a L.L.B. in 1915. He died on October 17, 1977, in the Watkins Hospital in Quitman, Mississippi, after a long illness.

Political career 
He was elected to the Mississippi House of Representatives in November 1915, representing Clarke County, as a Democrat. From 1920 to 1924, he was re-elected a floater representative, representing Clarke and Jasper counties. Later, he became the Sheriff of Clarke County.

Personal life 
He married Ulrica Strobel, and they had at least two children.

References 

1888 births
1977 deaths
People from Quitman, Mississippi
People from Lauderdale County, Mississippi
Democratic Party members of the Mississippi House of Representatives